The Fairchild J83  turbojet was developed starting in 1955 to power cruise missiles used as un-armed decoys for bomber aircraft. The engine's development was terminated in November 1958.

Design and development

In March 1953, the United States Air Force released General Operational Requirement (GOR) 16, which called air- and ground-launched decoy missiles to increase the effectiveness of Strategic Air Command bombers by confusing and saturating an air defense system. In December 1955, Fairchild was awarded a contract to develop the ground-launched decoy Weapon System 123A which included the XSM-73 Goose. McDonnell Aircraft was chosen in February 1956 to build the ADM-20 Quail air-launched decoy.

Two engine contracts were awarded in November 1954 to minimize development risk for both decoys. Each engine was in the 2,450 lbf (10.9 kN) thrust class with a thrust to weight ratio goal of 10:1. General Electric was awarded a contract for the development of the J85 and Fairchild was awarded a contract for a competing engine, the J83. Fairchild proposed a lightweight engine of conventional design. GE used a more advanced design which yielded a higher thrust to weight ratio.

A J83 was operating by early 1957. A B-57 Canberra was modified and used as a flying engine testbed for the J83. The J83 powered the XSM-73 Goose on 15 test flights.

Fairchild competed with two other engine manufacturers to provide the powerplant for the Canadair Tutor. A license-built J85 was chosen. The Northrop XQ-4A, was developed to use the J83 engine, but when the engine could not be developed in time the XQ-4A was canceled.

In November 1958, the J83 was canceled one month before the XSM-73. The USAF determined that the J85 had a higher probability of meeting the desired performance goals. The J85 could also be used to power the ADM-20 Quail decoy, the XSM-73 missile, and the T-38 Talon trainer. The J83 could only be used to power the XSM-73.

After the J83 was canceled, Fairchild had no other applications for the engine. As a result, operations at the Fairchild Engine Division plant at Deer Park in Long Island ended in the summer of 1959.

The McDonnell 119, an unsuccessful early business jet, was originally designed in 1957 to use the J83, but McDonnell had to modify the prototype to accept the Westinghouse J34 after the termination of the J83 program.

Applications
 XSM-73 Goose
 Northrop XQ-4A (never built)
 McDonnell 119 (redesigned to accept alternate engines)

Specifications

See also

References

 The History of North American Small Gas Turbine Aircraft Engines, William Fleming and Richard Leyes, AIAA, 1999

1950s turbojet engines
Abandoned military aircraft engine projects of the United States